The Church of the Holy Apostles is a 14th-century Byzantine church in the northern Greek city of Thessaloniki. Because of its outstanding Byzantine mosaics and architecture, and its testimony to the importance of Thessaloniki in early and medieval Christianity, the church is inscribed on the UNESCO World Heritage List along with other Paleochristian and Byzantine monuments of Thessaloniki.

Location
The church is located at the start of Olympou Street, near the city's western medieval walls.

History and description

As evidenced by remnants of a column to the south of the church and a cistern to its northwest, it originally formed part of a larger complex. Consequently, it appears that the church was originally built as the katholikon of a monastery.

The date of its construction is not entirely clear: the founder's inscription above the entrance, the monograms in the capitals and other inscriptions refer to Nephon I, Patriarch of Constantinople in 1310–1314, as the ktetor. Another inscription on the eastern wall commemorates the same patriarch and his pupil, the hegumenos Paul, as first and second ktetores respectively. Recent analysis using carbon-14 however points to a later date for the entire structure, ca. 1329. A depiction of the hegumenos Paul kneeling before Mary, as well as a series of Marian scenes lead to the conclusion that the church was dedicated to Mary, perhaps to be identified with the Monastery of Theotokos Gorgoepikoos.

The building belongs to the type of the composite, five-domed cross-in-square churches, with four supporting columns. It also features a narthex with a U-shaped peristoon (an ambulatory with galleries), with small domes at each corner. There are also two small side-chapels to the east. The exterior walls feature rich decoration with a variety of brick-work patterns.

The interior gives a very vertical impression, as the ratio of height to width of the church's central bay is 5 to 1. The interior decoration consists of rich mosaics on the upper levels, inspired by Constantinopolitan models. These are particularly important as some of the last examples of Byzantine mosaics (and the last of its kind in Thessaloniki itself). Frescoes complete the decoration on the lower levels of the main church, but also on the narthex and one of the chapels. These too show influence from Constantinople, and were possibly executed by a workshop from the imperial capital, perhaps the same which decorated the Chora Church. They were probably carried out under the patronage of the hegumenos Paul, after 1314 or in the period 1328–1334.

With the conquest of the city by the Ottoman Turks, in ca. 1520–1530 the church was converted into a mosque with the name Soğuksu Camii ("Mosque of the Cold Water"). As was their usual practice, the Ottomans covered the mosaics and frescoes with plaster, after they removed the gold tesserae. The church's modern name, "Holy Apostles", was not attributed to the building until the 19th century.

Restoration and the gradual revealing of the frescoes began in 1926. After the 1978 earthquake, the building was strengthened, and in 2002, the mosaics were cleaned up.

See also
History of Roman and Byzantine domes

References

External links

Buildings and structures completed in 1329
14th-century Eastern Orthodox church buildings
Byzantine church buildings in Thessaloniki
World Heritage Sites in Greece
Mosques converted from churches in Ottoman Greece
Church buildings with domes
14th-century churches in Greece
Former mosques in Greece
14th-century establishments in the Byzantine Empire